Nguyễn Việt Thắng (born September 13, 1981) is a Vietnamese professional football manager and former player who is the manager of V.League 2 club Can Tho.

Club career
Thắng was one of the talent of Vietnam football after being found Ho Chi Minh City Police F.C. In 2002, he moved to Hoàng Anh Gia Lai after spending 3 years playing for the club.

In 2003, he was believed to participate in a match-fixing scandal with another Hoàng Anh Gia Lai player in 2003 ASEAN Club Championship. Vietnam Football Federation decided to ban him from all domestic league for 3 years. In 2006, he came back and played for Đồng Tâm Long An F.C.

During the time he was banned by the Vietnam Football Federation in 2005, he was sent to F.C. Porto B for training so that he could prepare for his returning to play in V-League.

International career
Việt Thắng was chosen to play for the national team in 2002 FIFA World Cup qualification along with other stars such as Lê Huỳnh Đức. However, two years later, because of the ban from the federation, he could not play for the national team for 3 years.

In 2007, Việt Thắng returned to the national team but he missed the 2007 AFC Asian Cup. In 2008, he was chosen to play in 2008 AFF Suzuki Cup. He is the partner of striker Le Cong Vinh in the starting line-up at the tournament. He finished the tournament with one goal and one assist.

Honour
Vietnam
ASEAN Football Championship
Champion: 2008

References

External links
 

1981 births
Living people
Vietnamese footballers
People from Long An Province
V.League 1 players
Vietnam international footballers
Association football forwards
Becamex Binh Duong FC players
Thanh Hóa FC players
Long An FC players
Vissai Ninh Bình FC players
FC Porto B players